Pétur Jens Thorsteinsson (4 June 1854 – 27 July 1929) was an Icelandic businessman, merchant and entrepreneur. He was one of the key founders of Milljónarfélagið along with Thor Jensen.

Family
Pétur was married to Ásthildur Guðmundsdóttir. Their children include artist Muggur and footballers Samuel Thorsteinsson, Gunnar Thorsteinsson and Friðþjófur Thorsteinsson.

References

1854 births
1929 deaths
19th-century Icelandic people
20th-century Icelandic businesspeople
Icelandic businesspeople